Talisay, officially the City of Talisay, is a 4th class component city in the province of Negros Occidental, Philippines. According to the 2020 census, it has a population of 108,909 people.

It is part of the metropolitan area called Metro Bacolod, which includes its neighbors Silay to the north and Bacolod to the south.

Talisay is often confused with another Visayas city also named Talisay, which is a component city in Cebu.

History

The Negritos, natives who led nomadic lives at the foot of scenic North Negros mountain ranges, originally inhabited Talisay.  In 1788, families of Malay descent settled in the pristine part of Negros Island and named it Minuluan.  Unknown to many, the sugar industry in province has its very roots in Talisay. The enterprising Recollect priest led by Fray Fernando Cuenca, spurred the economic development of this once sleepy Sitio through the planting of sugarcane in vast tracts of land we call ‘haciendas’. still part of the City of smiles

The seedlings, brought from Spain, thrived well in the rich, loamy soil. Fray Cuenca improved sugar production of the crude wooden mills with the invention of ‘Molino de Agua’. The Spanish colonizers became guardians of our economic, socio-political and spiritual lives, and with more of the Minuluan population embracing the Catholic faith, the Sitio was decreed a town on September 10, 1850, with San Nicolas de Tolentino as its patron saint. It was renamed Talisay after the tree that grew in abundance along the mouth of the Matab-ang River.

To accommodate the growing population, three more barrios were established – Dos Hermanas and San Fernando in the northern part and Concepcion in the South.

At the turn of the century, Talisay became a significant player in revolt against Spain through the leadership of General Aniceto Lacson.  The wily general and erstwhile Katipunero of the North teamed up with General Araneta from the South during the victorious Cinco de Noviembre uprising in 1898 that saw the Spaniards capitulating without bloodshed.  The intervening years saw Talisay growing and methamorphosing into the budding city that is today-full of promise and potential.

Cityhood

On February 11, 1998, by virtue of Republic Act No. 8489, Talisay through the effort of its local official led by the Mayor Amelo Lizares was finally elevated into a city.

Geography

Barangays
Talisay City is politically subdivided into 27 barangays.

Climate

Demographics

Economy

Business process outsourcing
In 2016, business process outsourcing (BPO) company iQor opens its call/contact center in Talisay, the first BPO company in the city.

Education
Talisay is also known for its 2 major tertiary institutions: The Technological University of the Philippines – Visayas and Carlos Hilado Memorial State University, Main Campus.

Places of interest

See also
Metro Bacolod
Bacolod
Negros Revolution

References

External links

 
Talisay City Profile at the Official Website of Negros Occidental
 [ Philippine Standard Geographic Code]
2007 Philippine Census Information Region VI - Western Visayas
Local Governance Performance Management System

Cities in Negros Occidental
Metro Bacolod
Component cities in the Philippines